The 1982–83 Purdue Boilermakers men's basketball team represented Purdue University as a member of the Big Ten Conference during the 1982–83 college basketball season. The Boilermakers were led by third-year head coach Gene Keady and played their home games at Mackey Arena in West Lafayette, Indiana. Purdue finished tied for second in the Big Ten standings and received an at-large bid to the NCAA tournament as No. 5 seed in the Mideast region. The Boilermakers were beaten by No. 4 seed Arkansas in the round of 32. The team finished with an overall record of 21–9 (11–7 Big Ten).

Roster

Schedule and results

|-
!colspan=9 style=|Non-Conference Regular Season

|-
!colspan=9 style=|Big Ten Regular Season

|-
!colspan=9 style=|NCAA Tournament

Rankings

References

Purdue Boilermakers men's basketball seasons
Purdue
Purdue
Purdue Boilermakers men's basketball
Purdue Boilermakers men's basketball